Karl Henke (22 July 1896 in Berlin – 27 April 1945 in Neutief) was an engineer officer in the Reichsheer during World War I, in the German inter-war army, the Reichswehr, and in the Wehrmacht.

Military service, World War I
Henke's military service began in 1914 as a cadet with a pioneer battalion. He was promoted to officer in 1915, but in 1916 was seriously wounded and unable to return to frontline service. Posted to Libau, he became involved in developing landing operations, an area in which he specialised for the remainder of his career.

Continuing to serve with the Reichswehr and then the Wehrmacht, by 1939 Henke had been promoted to Lieutenant-Colonel.

Military service, World War II
On September 1, 1939, Henke was involved in the first major battle of Nazi Germany's invasion of Poland, the Battle of Westerplatte, where he led the assault engineer company.

Henke was intended to lead Operation Nordlicht, the attempt to take Leningrad in 1942, but when this was cancelled was transferred to the Crimea, where the Seventeenth Army was eventually trapped by Soviet forces. Here, Henke organised the evacuation of troops across the Strait of Kerch, an action for which he received the Knight's Cross of the Iron Cross, and from the Kuban bridgehead. Promoted to Major-General, and appointed the senior commander of Wehrmacht landing operations, Henke oversaw the evacuation of German troops from islands in the Baltic Sea and from Estonia late in 1944.

From January 1945 Henke became responsible for the supply of Fourth Army, trapped in the Heiligenbeil pocket in East Prussia. In this role he was in part responsible for the evacuation of up to a million civilians from East Prussia and through the port of Pillau, which was retained as long as possible; on 24 April, he was placed in command of the 290th Infantry Division, which had been transported by sea from the Courland Pocket. Henke and his unit finally abandoned Pillau on 25 April for the nearby Batterie Lehmberg fortifications at Neutief (Noytif was Russian correspondence of Neutef before 1946)  on the Frische Nehrung. After a failed breakout attempt around 200 men continued to resist the besieging Soviet forces to the last round at 15:30 on 27 April; Henke, refusing to surrender, then shot himself. It is said that the opposing Soviet commander praised Henke's bravery and treated Henke's surviving men well - unusual conduct for either side on the Eastern Front.

Awards and decorations
 Iron Cross (1914)
 2nd Class
 1st Class
 Wound Badge (1914)
 in Black
 Cross of Honor
 Wehrmacht Long Service Award 4th to 1st Class
 Sudetenland Medal with Prague Castle Bar
 War Merit Cross with Swords
 2nd Class
 Iron Cross (1939)
 2nd Class
 1st Class
 Knight's Cross of the Iron Cross on 4 August 1943 as Oberst and commander of Pionier-Landungs-Regiment 770 (motorized)

See also
 List of Knight's Cross Recipients

References
Lexikon der Wehrmacht - Karl Henke at www.lexikon-der-wehrmacht.de German-language article at Lexicon der Wehrmacht

Footnotes

1896 births
1945 deaths
Major generals of the German Army (Wehrmacht)
German Army personnel of World War I
Military personnel from Berlin
People from the Province of Brandenburg
Recipients of the Knight's Cross of the Iron Cross
Prussian Army personnel
Suicides by firearm in Germany
German military personnel who committed suicide